Perez Hastings Field (October 27, 1820 – August 30, 1872) was an American businessman and politician from New York.

Life 
Field was born on October 27, 1820, in Geneva, New York, the son of David Field and Electa Hastings.

Field engaged in the grain business, dealing in grain in Geneva. He erected a grain elevator and owned a malthouse, and purchased grain from farmers on both sides of Seneca Lake.

In 1860, Field was elected to the New York State Assembly as a Republican, representing the Ontario County 1st District. He served in the Assembly in 1861, 1863, and 1864.

In 1869, Field married Clara Electa Eddy. They had two children, Alice Electa and William Perez.

Field died on the steamer Metis after it sank near Stonington, Connecticut on August 30, 1872. He was buried in Glenwood Cemetery in Geneva.

References

External links 

 The Political Graveyard
 Perez H. Field at Find a Grave

1820 births
1872 deaths
Politicians from Geneva, New York
19th-century American businesspeople
Businesspeople from New York (state)
19th-century American politicians
Republican Party members of the New York State Assembly
Deaths due to shipwreck at sea
Burials in New York (state)